Shastri Park is a neighborhood located in North East Delhi in India. The name of the area is dedicated to Indian freedom fighter Lal Bahadur Shastri. It is the location of one of the first metro station in Delhi. Delhi Metro developed the area, including Delhi IT Park and a neighboring residential enclave.

Colleges
dr. akhilesh das gupta institute of technology and management

Hospitals
Jag Pravesh Chandra Hospital - provides minimum free basic health care services to the people living in North East District.

References

Neighbourhoods in Delhi
Memorials to Lal Bahadur Shastri
North East Delhi district